Congress Heights is an island-platformed Washington Metro station in the Congress Heights neighborhood of Washington, D.C., United States. The station was opened on January 13, 2001, and is operated by the Washington Metropolitan Area Transit Authority (WMATA). Providing service for only the Green Line, the station is located at Alabama Avenue and 13th Street, lying under St. Elizabeths Hospital. Congress Heights is the last Green Line station in the District of Columbia going southeast.

Groundbreaking for the final segment of the Green Line occurred on September 23, 1995, and the station opened on January 13, 2001.

Congress Heights is the closest metro station to the Entertainment and Sports Arena, home to the Washington Mystics of the WNBA and the Capital City Go-Go of the NBA G League.

Station layout
Congress Heights is the southernmost underground station on the Green Line and features an island platform with escalator entrances on either side of Alabama Avenue. A park and ride and bus bays are located adjacent to the northern entrance.

References

External links

 The Schumin Web Transit Center: Congress Heights Station
 Alabama Avenue entrance from Google Maps Street View

Congress Heights
Stations on the Green Line (Washington Metro)
Washington Metro stations in Washington, D.C.
Railway stations in the United States opened in 2001
2001 establishments in Washington, D.C.
Railway stations located underground in Washington, D.C.